Clearwater is an unincorporated community in Idaho County, Idaho, United States.

History
Clearwater's population was 40 in 1960.

References

Unincorporated communities in Idaho County, Idaho
Unincorporated communities in Idaho